Rumsey Rock was a rock in Hung Hom Bay, Victoria Harbour, Hong Kong. Administratively it belonged to the Kowloon City District.

The rock was incorporated in reclaimed land between Tsim Sha Tsui East and Hung Hom in Kowloon in the 1970s. The site of the rock is now part of the Harbour Place private housing estate.

References

Former islands of Hong Kong
Victoria Harbour
Kowloon